Friele is a surname of Norwegian origin. Notable people with the surname include:
 Christian Friele (1821–1899), Norwegian newspaper editor
 Einar Friele (1901–1944), Norwegian resistance member
 Herman Friele (born 1943), Norwegian politician
 Johan Friele (1866–1927), Norwegian sailor
 Karen-Christine Friele (1935–2021), Norwegian gay rights activist

See also 
 Friel
 Friele, a Norwegian coffee manufacturer

Norwegian-language surnames